Sơn Tây is a district (huyện) of Quảng Ngãi province in the South Central Coastal region of Vietnam. As of 2003 the district had a population of 15,164. The district covers an area of 381 km2. The district capital lies at Sơn Dung.

References

Districts of Quảng Ngãi province